Goodsprings Valley is a basin in Clark County of southern Nevada. Goodsprings Valley drains southeast into the Ivanpah Valley. The valley is the location of the town of Goodsprings, Nevada in the midst of the basin.

References

Valleys of Nevada
Valleys of Clark County, Nevada